The Intellec computers were a series of early microcomputers Intel produced in the 1970s as a development platform for their processors. The Intellec computers were among the first microcomputers ever sold, predating the Altair 8800 by at least two years.

Introduction
The first series of Intellecs included the Intellec 4 for the 4004, the Intellec 4 Mod 40 for the 4040, the Intellec 8 for the 8008, and the Intellec 8 Mod 80 for the 8080.

The Intellec 4 and 8 were introduced at the June 1973 National Computer Conference in the New York Coliseum. The Intellec computers were sold not to the general public, only to developers, and a very limited number were built. The Intellec 8 retailed for $2,395.

Features 

The Intellecs have resident monitors stored in ROMs. They also included an assembler, linker, and debugger, as well as the ability to act as an in-circuit emulator. Additionally, a PL/M compiler, cross-assembler and simulator were available, which allowed writing programs in a higher-level language than assembly. FORTRAN compilers were also available. The Intellec 8 supported a Teletype operating at 110 baud, a high speed punched paper tape reader and a CRT terminal at 1200 baud. 

The Intellec 8 is able to address up to 16K of memory and came with 5K pre-installed. The Intellec 4 came with 1K of PROM and 4k of RAM for instruction memory, as well as 320 4-bit words of data memory, expandable to 2560 words. The Intellec 8 ran with a two-phase clock of 800kHz, resulting in an instruction cycle time of 12.5us. The Intellec 4 ran at a slower clock rate of 750kHz, but had a faster instruction cycle time of 10.8us. Both systems were available in "Bare Bones" editions, which omitted the front panel, power supply, and completed chassis; instead, it is designed to mount into a rack.

Usage

Intel did not market the Intellec as a general-purpose microcomputer, but rather as a development system. As the first microprocessors were intended to run embedded systems such as in calculators, cash registers, scientific instrumentation, computer terminals, printers, plotters, industrial robots, synthesizers, game consoles, and so on, the Intellec was used for programming programmable memory chips used by embedded systems, e.g. the 2048-bit (256-byte) Intel 1602A programmable read-only memory (PROM) or erasable 1702A EPROM chips which were plugged into a ZIF socket on the Intellec-8's front panel. The chip-programming socket is the green device in the lower right corner of the Intellec's front panel.

Intel also marketed the Intellec microcomputer development system as a system for developing other OEM microcomputers.

See also
 Intel System Development Kit
 List of early microcomputers
 ISIS (operating system)

References

Early microcomputers
Intel products